Laxmi Narayan Temple is located in the Kapileswar temple precinct. The enshrined deity is Laxmi- Narayana seated in padmasana over a lotus pedestal. Narayana has four arms holding conch in his upper right hand, a lotus in upper left hand and lower left hand is holding a mace. Laxmi is seating on his left lap. Both the images are crowned with Kirita mukuta. Laxmi is holding a lotus. The temple has a vimana in pidha order. On plan the temple measure 1.46 m in length and on its width it is merged with the kitchen walls. The total height of the temple is 3.24 m (bada 1.34 m, gandi 1.15 m, and mastaka 0.75 m). The cella measure 0.90 square m. There is a Garuda image over a pillar in front of the temple. The doorjamb measure 1.15 m in height x 0.50 m in width. This temple is closely attached with the pathway of the kitchen.

See also 
List of Hindu temples in India#Orissa

References 
Lesser Known Monuments of Bhubaneswar by Dr. Sadasiba Pradhan

Hindu temples in Bhubaneswar